Jonah Ebanks (born 7 May 1996) is a Caymanian footballer who plays as a midfielder for Academy and the Cayman Islands national team.

International career
Ebanks debuted for the Cayman Islands on 12 October 2018, in the CONCACAF Nations League qualifying rounds against the Dominican Republic in a 3–0 defeat.

On 8 September 2019, Ebanks scored his first goal for Cayman Islands against Barbados, resulting a 3–2 victory.

Career statistics

Scores and results list Cayman Islands' goal tally first, score column indicates score after each Ebanks goal.

References

1996 births
Living people
Association football midfielders
Caymanian footballers
Cayman Islands Premier League players
Cayman Islands international footballers
Cayman Islands under-20 international footballers